Pedro Otero (born 20 June 1920) was a Cuban basketball player. He competed in the men's tournament at the 1948 Summer Olympics.

References

External links
 

1920 births
Possibly living people
Cuban men's basketball players
Olympic basketball players of Cuba
Basketball players at the 1948 Summer Olympics